Fiachra is an Irish male given name. It may refer to:

Clerics 

 Saint Fiacre of Breuil (died 670), missionary in France
 Fiachra mac Colmain (500-558) Bishop of Armagh
 Fiachra Ua Focarta (died 1006) abbot of Clonfert
 Fiachra Ó Ceallaigh (born 1933) bishop of Dublin

Legendary kings 

 Fiachrae son of Eochaid Mugmedon and namesake of Tireragh, County Sligo
 Fiachra Suighe legendary pre-Christian founder of the Dal Fiachrach Suighe
 Fiacha mac Delbaíth, legendary High King

Medieval kings 

 Fiachra Cossalach (died 710) king in Ulster
 Fiachra Finn (fl 5th century) king of Uí Maine in Connacht

Sportsmen 

 Fiachra McArdle (b.1983) association footballer
 Fiachra Breathnach (b.1986) Gaelic footballer from Galway
 Fiachra Lynch (b.1987) Gaelic footballer from Cork

Other 

 Fiachra, mythological son of Ler from the Children of Lir legend
 Fiachra Mac Brádaigh (1690-1760) writer
 Fiachra Trench (b.1941) composer

Similar names
 Fiach
 Fiacha
 Fiachna

Irish-language masculine given names